North America: Growth of a Continent was an educational television show which was produced and broadcast by TVOntario in 1980–81. The series was narrated by Gordon Pinsent.

Episodes
 "From the Beginning"
 "Mapping the Land"
 "Patterns and Climates"
 "Vegetation and Soil"
 "Then Came Man"
 "Tilling the Land"
 "Logging the Land"
 "Harvesting the Sea"
 "From the Ground Up"
 "The Fossil Storehouse"
 "The Search for Power"
 "The Man-Made World"
 "Delivering the Goods"

TVO original programming
1980 Canadian television series debuts
1981 Canadian television series endings
Science education television series
1980s Canadian documentary television series